The Weller UW-9 Sprint is a German ultralight aircraft designed and produced by Weller Flugzeugbau of Bibersfeld. The aircraft is supplied as a kit for amateur construction or as a complete ready-to-fly-aircraft.

Design and development
The UW-9 is intended as a nostalgic 1930s style design that would comply with the Fédération Aéronautique Internationale microlight rules. It features a strut-braced parasol wing, a two-seats-in-tandem open cockpit, fixed conventional landing gear and a single engine in tractor configuration.

The aircraft fuselage is made from welded steel tubing, with bolted-together aluminum tubing spar ladder-construction wings, all covered in doped aircraft fabric. The wing is supported by "V"-struts and jury struts. The tailplane is also supported by "V"-struts. Standard engines available are the  Sauer UL 2100, the  Limbach L2000EA, the  Rotax 912ULS four-stroke powerplants, or the  Rotec R2800 radial engine. The Sprint is approved for aero-towing gliders and banner towing in Germany.

Specifications (version)

References

External links

2000s German ultralight aircraft
Homebuilt aircraft
Single-engined tractor aircraft